Iulian Cristian Ștefan (born 1 June 2001) is a Romanian professional footballer who plays as a central midfielder for Liga II side Unirea Constanța.

Club career

Academica Clinceni
He made his league debut on 26 May 2021 in Liga I match against CS Universitatea Craiova.

Career statistics

Club

References

External links
 
 

2001 births
Living people
People from Bucharest
Romanian footballers
Association football midfielders
Liga I players
Liga II players
CS Pandurii Târgu Jiu players
LPS HD Clinceni players
FC Unirea Constanța players